Red Hawk is a type of American triple-crème aged cow's-milk cheese with a brine-washed rind produced by the Cowgirl Creamery in Point Reyes Station, California. The brine wash encourages the development of the red-orange rind and the cheese was named after red-tailed hawks that are frequently seen around the city of Point Reyes Station.

See also

 List of American cheeses

References

External links 
Cowgirl Creamery

American cheeses
Cow's-milk cheeses
Washed-rind cheeses
Food and drink in the San Francisco Bay Area